John Patitucci (born December 22, 1959) is an American jazz bassist and composer.

Biography

John James Patitucci was born in Brooklyn, New York. When he was 12, he bought his first bass and decided on his career. He listened to bass parts in R&B songs on the radio and on his grandfather's jazz records. He cites as influences Oscar Peterson's albums with Ray Brown and Wes Montgomery's with Ron Carter. For the development of rhythm, he points to the time he has spent with Danilo Pérez, a pianist from Panama.

In the late 1970s he studied acoustic bass at San Francisco State University and Long Beach State University. He began his professional career when he moved to Los Angeles in 1980 and made connections with Henry Mancini, Dave Grusin, and Tom Scott. From the mid-1980s to the mid-1990s he was a member of three Chick Corea groups: the Elektric Band, the Akoustic Band, and the quartet. As a leader he formed a trio with Joey Calderazzo and Peter Erskine, and a quartet with Vinnie Colaiuta, Steve Tavaglione, and John Beasley. He has played with Herbie Hancock, Wayne Shorter, and Roy Haynes. Patitucci switches between double bass and electric bass.

He was the artistic director of the Bass Collective, a school for bassists in New York City and is involved with the Thelonious Monk Institute of Jazz and the Betty Carter Jazz Ahead program. He was Professor of Jazz Studies at City College of New York. In June 2012 he started the Online Jazz Bass School. He was appointed artist in residence at Berklee College of Music.

Back in Brooklyn
Back in Brooklyn is a documentary about Patitucci released by August Sky Films in 2015. Directed by Patrick Cone, the film includes footage from rehearsals, studio sessions, live performances, and interviews with Chick Corea, Wayne Shorter, and Herbie Hancock. The documentary was filmed while or around the time Patitucci's album Brooklyn was recorded.

Awards and honors
 Most Valuable Player, National Academy of Recording Arts and Sciences, 1986
 Best Jazz Bassist, Guitar Player magazine Readers' Poll, 1992, 1994, 1995
 Best Jazz Bassist, Bass Player magazine Readers' Poll, 1993–1996
 Grammy Award nomination, Beyond the Sound Barrier as member of the Wayne Shorter Quartet, Best Jazz Instrumental Album, Individual or Group, 2005
 Lifetime Achievement award, Bass Player magazine, 2019

Discography

As leader/co-leader 
 John Patitucci (GRP, 1987)
 On the Corner (GRP, 1989)
 Sketchbook (GRP, 1990)
 Heart of the Bass (Stretch, 1992)
 Another World (GRP, 1993)
 Mistura Fina (GRP, 1995)
 One More Angel (Concord, 1997)
 Now (Concord, 1998)
 Imprint (Concord, 2000)
 Communion (Concord, 2001)
 Songs, Stories & Spirituals (Concord, 2003)
 Line by Line (Concord, 2006)
 Remembrance (Concord, 2009)
 Viva Hermeto! with André Marques, Brian Blade (Borandá, 2014)
 Brooklyn (Three Faces, 2015) 
 Soul of the Bass (Three Faces, 2019)

As group 
Tamarack
 Tamarack (Parbar Music, 1981)

The Hudson Project with Peter Erskine, John Abercrombie, Bob Mintzer
 The Hudson Project (Stretch, 2000) – live recorded in 1998

The Great Jazz Trio
  'S Wonderful with Hank Jones, Jack DeJohnette (Eighty-eight's, 2004)
 Speak Low with Hank Jones and Jack DeJohnette (Eighty-Eight's, 2005)
 Stella by Starlight with Hank Jones and Omar Hakim and guest Sadao Watanabe (Eighty-Eight's, 2006)
 July 5 th - Live at Birdland NY with Hank Jones and Omar Hakim (Eighty-Eight's, 2007)
 July 6 th - Live at Birdland NY with Hank Jones and Omar Hakim (Eighty-Eight's, 2007)

Others
 All Strings Attached with Tal Farlow, John Abercrombie, Larry Carlton, Larry Coryell, John Scofield (Verve, 1987)
 Continental Talk with Randy Brecker, Steve Gadd, Stanislav Mitrovic, Ratko Zjaca (In+Out, 2009)
 Children of the Light with Danilo Pérez, Brian Blade (2015)
 TRIO with Vinnie Colaiuta, Bill Cunliffe (2021)

As sideman or guest 

With Karrin Allyson
 Ballads: Remembering John Coltrane (Concord Jazz, 2001) – recorded in 2000
 Many a New Day: Karrin Allyson Sings Rodgers & Hammerstein (Motéma, 2015)

With David Benoit
 Freedom at Midnight (GRP, 1987)
 Waiting for Spring (GRP, 1989)
 Letter to Evan (GRP, 1992)

With Cheryl Bentyne
 Something Cool (Columbia, 1992)
 Talk of the Town (Paddle Wheel, 2002)

With Gary Burton
 Departure (Concord Jazz, 1997)
 For Hamp, Red, Bags, and Cal (Concord Jazz, 2001)With Chick Corea The Chick Corea Elektric Band (GRP, 1986)
 Light Years (GRP, 1987)
 Eye of the Beholder (GRP, 1988)
 Chick Corea Akoustic Band (GRP, 1989)
 Inside Out (GRP, 1990)
 Alive (GRP, 1991) – live
 Beneath the Mask (GRP, 1991)
 Time Warp (GRP, 1995)
 Live from Blue Note Tokyo (Stretch, 1996) – live recorded in 1992
 Rendezvous in New York (Stretch, 2003) – live
 To the Stars (Stretch, 2004)
 The Musician (Concord Jazz, 2017)[3CD] – liveWith Al Di Meola The Infinite Desire (Telarc, 1998)
 World Sinfonía III – The Grande Passion (Telarc, 2000)
 Consequence of Chaos (Telarc, 2006)With Victor Feldman To Chopin with Love (Palo Alto, 1983)
 Rio Nights (TBA, 1987) – recorded in 1977 & 87With Dave Grusin The Gershwin Connection (GRP, 1991)
 GRP All-Star Big Band (GRP, 1992)
 Dave Grusin Presents GRP All-Star Big Band Live! (GRP, 1993) – live
 Homage to Duke (GRP, 1993)
 All Blues (GRP, 1995) – recorded in 1994
 West Side Story (N2K Encoded Music, 1997)With Steve Khan The Green Field (Tone Center, 2005)
 Borrowed Time (ESC, 2007)With Chuck Loeb The Moon, the Stars and the Setting Sun (Shanachie, 1998)
 Listen (Shanachie, 1999)With Eric Marienthal Voices of the Heart (GRP, 1988)
 Round Trip (GRP, 1989)
 Crossroads (GRP, 1990)
 Oasis (GRP, 1991)
 One Touch (GRP, 1993)
 Bridges with Chuck Loeb (Peak, 2015)With Danilo Pérez Central Avenue (Impulse!, 1998)
 Motherland (Verve, 2000)
 ...Till Then (Verve, 2003)With Lee Ritenour Stolen Moments (GRP, 1990)
 Wes Bound (GRP, 1993) – recorded in 1992
 World of Brazil (GRP, 2005) – compilation
 Smoke 'N' Mirrors (Peak, 2006)With Tom Scott
 Keep This Love Alive (GRP, 1991)
 Born Again (GRP, 1992)

With Wayne Shorter
 Phantom Navigator (Columbia,1986)
 Footprints Live! (Verve, 2002) – live recorded in 2001
 Alegría (Verve, 2003)
 Beyond the Sound Barrier (Verve, 2005) – recorded in 2002–04
 Without a Net (Blue Note, 2013)
 Emanon (Blue Note, 2018)

With Edward Simon
 The Process (Criss Cross, 2002)
 Unicity (CAM Jazz, 2006) 
 Poesia (CAM Jazz, 2009) – recorded in 2008
 Trio Live in New York at Jazz Standard (Sunnyside 2013) – live recorded in 2010

With others
 The Manhattan Transfer, Vocalese (Atlantic, 1985) – 1 track
 Frank Gambale, Present for the Future (Legato, 1987)
 Emiel Van Egdom, This Is for You (CD Baby, 1988)
 Martin Taylor, Sarabanda (Gaia, 1989) – recorded in 1987
 Dave Samuels, Ten Degrees North (MCA, 1989)
 Warren Zevon, Transverse City (Virgin, 1989)
 Everything but the Girl, The Language of Life (Atlantic, 1990) – recorded in 1989
 Mark Isham, Mark Isham (Virgin, 1990)
 Eddie Daniels, Nepenthe (GRP, 1990)
 Wolfgang Muthspiel, The Promise (Amadeo, 1990)
 Toni Tennille, Never Let Me Go (Bay Cities, 1991)
 Andy LaVerne, Pleasure Seekers (Triloka, 1991)
 Natalie Cole, Unforgettable... with Love (Elektra, 1991) – recorded in 1989–91
 Gonzalo Rubalcaba, Images (Blue Note, 1991) – live
 Roger Waters, Amused to Death (Columbia, 1992)
 Pat Coil, Just Ahead (Sheffield Lab, 1992)
 Kei Akagi, Playroom (Moo, 1992)
 John Beasley, A Change of Heart (Windham Hill Jazz, 1993)
 Charlie Bisharat, Along the Amazon (GTS, 1993)
 Jeff Beal, Three Graces (Triloka, 1993)
 Vinnie Colaiuta, Vinnie Colaiuta (Stretch, 1994)
 Sergio Salvatore, Always a Beginning (Concord Jazz, 1996)
 Bobby Caldwell, Blue Condition (Sin-Drome, 1996)
 Arturo Sandoval, Swingin'  (GRP, 1996)
 Monty Alexander, Echoes of Jilly's (Concord Jazz, 1997)
 Mike Stern, Give and Take (Atlantic, 1997) – recorded in 1996
 Lynne Arriale Trio, Long Road Home (TCB, 1997)
 Christian Jacob, Maynard Ferguson Presents Christian Jacob (Concord Jazz, 1997) – recorded in 1996
 Les Czimber, Someday My Prince Will Come (Miracle, 1997) – recorded in 1996
 Peter Erskine, Behind Closed Doors Vol. 1 (Fuzzy Music, 1998) – recorded in 1991–96
 Gerardo Núñez, Calima (Alula, 1998)
 Hélio Alves, Trio (Reservoir, 1998) – recorded in 1997
 Randy Waldman, Wigged Out (Whirlybird, 1998)
 Joanne Brackeen, Pink Elephant Magic (Arkadia Jazz, 1999) – recorded in 1998
 Nick Brignola, All Business (Reservoir, 1999)
 Michael Davis, Bonetown (Whirlybird, 1999)
 Rich Franks, For Our Friend (Port-Of-Call, 1999)
 Roy Haynes, The Roy Haynes Trio (Verve, 2000) – recorded in 1999
 Various Artists, Celebrating the Music of Weather Report (Telarc, 2000)
 Jay Beckenstein, Eye Contact (Windham Hill Jazz, 2000)
 Joey Calderazzo, Joey Calderazzo (Columbia, 2000)
 Dave Eshelman, Mystique (Jazz Garden, 2000) – recorded in 1999
 Jay Azzolina, Past Tense (Double-Time, 2000)
 Randy Waldman, UnReel (Concord Jazz, 2001)
 Walt Weiskopf, Man of Many Colors (Criss Cross, 2001) – recorded in 2000
 Paolo Di Sabatino, Threeo (Atelier Sawano, 2003) – recorded in 1999
 Tommy Smith, Evolution (Spartacus, 2003)
 Tim Garland, Change of Season (Sirocco Music, 2004)
 Manuel Valera, Forma Nueva (Mavo, 2004)
 Janis Siegel, Sketches of Broadway (Telarc, 2004)
 Don Friedman, Timeless (Eighty-Eight's, 2004) – recorded in 2003
 Herbie Hancock, Possibilities (Hear Music, 2005)
 Pat Martino, Remember: A Tribute to Wes Montgomery (Blue Note, 2006) – recorded in 2005
 Mike Holober, Wish List (Sons of Sound Recorded Music, 2006)
 Ferenc Nemeth, Night Songs (Dreamers Collective, 2007) – recorded in 2005
 Michael Brecker, Pilgrimage (EmArcy, 2007) – recorded in 2006
 School of the Arts featuring T Lavitz, School of the Arts (Magnatude, 2007)
 Tim Ries, Stones World (Sunnyside, 2008)[2CD]
 Tony DeMarco, The Sligo Indians (Smithsonian Folkways, 2008)
 Jack DeJohnette, Music We Are (Golden Beams, 2009) – recorded in 2008
 Adam Rogers, Sight (Criss Cross, 2009) – recorded in 2008
  Alessandro Galati, Jason Salad!  (Via Veneto Jazz, 1997)
 Enrico Pieranunzi, Live at Birdland (C.A.M. Jazz, 2010) – live recorded in 2008
 Magos Herrera, México Azul (Sony, 2010)
 Andreas Öberg, Six String Evolution (Resonance, 2010) – 1 track
 Kurt Elling, The Gate (Concord Jazz, 2011)
 Ben Monder, Hydra (Sunnyside, 2013)
 Antonio Sanchez, Three Times Three (C.A.M. Jazz, 2014)[2CD] – recorded in 2013
 José James, Yesterday I Had the Blues (Blue Note, 2015)
 Keith & Kristyn Getty, Facing A Task Unfinished (Getty Music, 2016) – 2 tracks
 Norah Jones, Day Breaks (Blue Note, 2016) – recorded in 2015
 John Finbury (composer), Sorte! (John Finbury, 2019)
 John Finbury (composer), Quatro (John Finbury, 2020)
 Dan Costa (composer), Beams (Dan Costa, 2023)

See also 
 List of jazz bassists

References

External links

 
 

1959 births
American jazz bass guitarists
American jazz double-bassists
Male double-bassists
San Francisco State University alumni
California State University, Long Beach alumni
City College of New York faculty
Jazz fusion bass guitarists
Living people
Post-bop bass guitarists
Musicians from Brooklyn
American jazz musicians
American people of Italian descent
People of Calabrian descent
21st-century American bass guitarists
Guitarists from New York (state)
American male bass guitarists
20th-century American bass guitarists
Jazz musicians from New York (state)
21st-century double-bassists
20th-century American male musicians
21st-century American male musicians
American male jazz musicians
Chick Corea Elektric Band members
GRP All-Star Big Band members
Criss Cross Jazz artists
Concord Records artists